Cyperus thyrsiflorus is a species of sedge that is native to southern parts of North America, Central America and northern parts of South America.

See also 
 List of Cyperus species

References 

thyrsiflorus
Plants described in 1816
Flora of Mexico
Flora of Bolivia
Flora of Alabama
Flora of Florida
Flora of Georgia (U.S. state)
Flora of Louisiana
Flora of Texas
Flora of Colombia
Flora of Costa Rica
Flora of Cuba
Flora of Ecuador
Flora of El Salvador
Flora of Guatemala
Flora of Honduras
Flora of Nicaragua
Flora of Panama
Flora of Paraguay
Flora of Peru
Flora of Venezuela
Flora of Trinidad
Taxa named by Franz Wilhelm Junghuhn
Flora without expected TNC conservation status